The Harry Potter series of fantasy novels by J. K. Rowling is one of the most translated series of all time, being available in 85 languages. This includes languages with fewer than a million speakers such as Basque, Greenlandic, and Welsh, as well as the Classical languages Latin and Ancient Greek. Additionally, regional adaptations of the books have been made to accommodate regional dialects such as the American English edition or the Valencian adaptation of Catalan.

For reasons of secrecy, translations were only allowed to begin after each book had been published in English, creating a lag of several months for readers of other languages. Impatient fans in many places simply bought the book in English instead. Harry Potter and the Order of the Phoenix became the first English language book to top France's best-seller list. In some cases, fans have created their own unofficial translations, either ahead of a licensed translation or when a licensed translation is unavailable.

Issues arising in the translation of Harry Potter include cultural references, riddles, anticipating future plot points, and Rowling's creative names for characters and other elements in the magical world which often involve word play and phonology.

Translation process 
For an authorised translation, the publisher must first negotiate and sign a contract with Rowling's agents, The Blair Partnership. The publishers select translators locally.

Translators were not granted access to the books before their official release date in English; hence, translation could start only after the English editions had been published, creating a lag of several months before the translations were made available. This necessary delay has boosted the sales of English language editions of the books to impatient fans, in countries where English is not the first language. Such was the clamour to read the fifth book that its English edition became the first English-language book ever to top the bookseller list in France. In Italy, impatient Potter fans organised "Operation Feather", deluging the publisher Salani with feathers (reminiscent of Hogwarts' messenger owls) to demand expedited publication for the Italian translation of the seventh and final book in the series. This has also caused unauthorised translations and fake versions of the books to appear in many countries.

The high profile and demand for a high-quality local translation means that a great deal of care is often taken in the task. In some countries, such as Italy, the first book was revised by the publishers and issued in an updated edition in response to readers who complained about the quality of the first translation. In countries such as China and Portugal, the translation is conducted by a group of translators working together to save time. Some of the translators hired to work on the books were well known before their work on Harry Potter, such as Viktor Golyshev, who oversaw the Russian translation of the series' fifth book. Golyshev was renowned for his translations of William Faulkner and George Orwell, and was known to snub the Harry Potter books in interviews and refer to them as inferior literature. The Turkish translation of books two to five was undertaken by Sevin Okyay, a popular literary critic and cultural commentator.

In 2017, Bloomsbury celebrated the series' 20th anniversary with an announcement that it had been officially translated into 79 languages. Since 2017, Bloomsbury has published or licensed translations into Scots, Hawaiian, Belarusian, Kazakh, Yiddish, and Māori.

Some translations, such as those to the dead Latin and Ancient Greek languages, were done as academic exercises, to stimulate interest in the languages and to provide students of those languages with modern reading texts. The Ancient Greek version, according to the translator, is the longest text written in Ancient Greek since the novels of Heliodorus of Emesa in the 3rd century AD, and took about a year to complete.

List of translations by language 
The original British English versions of the book were published in the United Kingdom by Bloomsbury. Note that in some countries, such as Spain and India, the series has been translated into several local languages; sometimes the book has been translated into two dialects of the same language in two countries (for example, separate Portuguese versions for Brazil and Portugal).

Unauthorised translations 
The impatience of the international Harry Potter fan community for translations of the books has led to the proliferation of unauthorised or pirate translations that are often hastily translated and posted on the internet chapter-by-chapter, or printed by small presses and sold illegally. The work may be done by multiple translators to speed the process. Such translations are often poorly written and riddled with errors. 

A team translated Harry Potter and the Deathly Hallows into Chinese three days after its English release. A director at People's Literature Publishing House, who obtained the official license, worried that the unauthorised translations would lead to the spread of pirated copies.

One notable case involved a French 16-year-old who published serialised translations of Harry Potter and the Deathly Hallows online. He was arrested and his site was later shut down; however, the wife of the official translator noted that these works do not necessarily hurt the official translation.

Another example occurred in Venezuela in 2003, when an illegal translation of the fifth book, Harry Potter and the Order of the Phoenix, appeared soon after the release of the English version and five months before the scheduled release of the Spanish translation. The pirate translation was apparently so bad that the translator added messages, including "Here comes something that I'm unable to translate, sorry," and "I'm sorry, I didn't understand what that meant" in some sections. Two people were arrested in connection with the pirated version.

Another case involved the Internet fan translation community, Harry auf Deutsch, formed to translate the Harry Potter books into German more rapidly. The German publisher of the Harry Potter books, Carlsen Verlag, filed a cease and desist against the fan translators; they complied, taking down the translations.

In some countries, where there were no authorised translations into the local language, translations not sanctioned by J. K. Rowling were prepared and published. Such was the case, for example, in Sri Lanka, where the books had been unofficially translated into Sinhala and possibly into Tamil. Authorised translations into both Sinhala and Tamil have since been published.

In Iran, several unauthorised translations of the Harry Potter books exist side by side. According to one source, there may be as many as 16 Persian translations in existence concurrently. Iran is not a member of the Universal Copyright Convention, so publishers are not prosecuted for publishing foreign books without respecting copyright or paying royalties.

A team consisting of seven Esperantist volunteers completed the translation of Harry Potter and the Philosopher's Stone into Esperanto (under the title Hari Poter kaj la ŝtono de la saĝuloj) in 2004. Rowling's representatives did not respond to offers from Esperanto-USA to make the translation available for publication. An on-line petition aimed at raising interest in the Esperanto translation has obtained support from approximately 800 individuals.

Agents representing J. K. Rowling have stated in the past that they cannot and do not intend to prevent individuals from translating Rowling's books for their own personal enjoyment, as long as the results are not made available to the general public.

Fake translations 

Whereas "pirate translations" are unauthorised translations of true Harry Potter books, "fake translations" have also appeared, which are published pastiches or fanfics that a foreign publisher has tried to pass off as the translation of the real book by Rowling. There have been several such books, the most famous of which is probably Harry Potter and Bao Zoulong which was written and published in China in 2002, before the release of the fifth book in Rowling's series, Harry Potter and the Order of the Phoenix.

Other fake Harry Potter books written in Chinese include Harry Potter and the Porcelain Doll (哈利・波特与瓷娃娃 or Hālì Bōtè yǔ Cíwáwa), Harry Potter and the Golden Turtle, and Harry Potter and the Crystal Vase. In August 2007, The New York Times noted that the publication of Rowling's Deathly Hallows had inspired "a surge of peculiarly Chinese imitations," and included plot synopses and excerpts from a number of derivative works, among them Harry Potter and the Chinese Overseas Students at the Hogwarts School of Witchcraft and Wizardry and Harry Potter and the Big Funnel.
 In 2003, legal pressure from the licensors of Harry Potter led an Indian publisher to stop publication of Harry Potter in Calcutta, a work in which Harry meets figures from Bengali literature.

Regional adaptations 
It is a common practice within the publishing industry to make minor changes in the text of books written in one region for publication in other regions. For example, there are a number of differences in British and American English spelling conventions; generally publishers change the spellings to conform to the expectations of their target market. Adaptation may also extend to vocabulary or grammatical choices that might impair legibility or impart some cognitive dissonance. Readers usually would not be aware of the adaptations, but the choice to change the title of the American edition of the first Harry Potter book from Harry Potter and the Philosopher's Stone to Harry Potter and the Sorcerer's Stone highlighted the practice and drew considerable attention.

The book's title was changed due to the American publisher's concern that children would be confused by a reference to philosophy. Other translations have also changed the first book's title, for instance, the French translation which changed Harry Potter and the Philosopher's Stone to Harry Potter at the School of Wizards for the same reason as the American translation, citing that the reference to the Philosopher's stone legend was "too obscure for a book aimed at the youth."

Other translations also have regional adaptations that have largely gone without much notice. The Spanish translation has been adapted to three regions: Europe, Latin America and Southern Cone. Others translations have adaptations that were published seemingly to enhance the identity of minority communities of speakers: Montenegrin (an adaptation of Serbian) and Valencian (an adaptation of Catalan). It is worth noting that some translations were completed when adaptations possibly would have been sufficient; for example, any of the Serbian, Croatian or Bosnian translations could have been adapted for each region.

A comprehensive list of differences between the American and British editions of the books is collected at the Harry Potter Lexicon website. The changes are mostly simple lexical switches to reflect the different dialects and prevent American readers from stumbling over unfamiliar Briticisms. Although it is common to adapt any text from British to American editions, in the case of the Harry Potter books, this standard practice has drawn criticism from readers who feel that the British English adds flavour to the series. Rowling herself expressed regret over changing the first book's title, as the Philosopher's stone is a legendary alchemical substance.

In an Associated Press interview, Rowling described how the alterations to the American editions came about:

Publisher Arthur Levine of Scholastic explained the changes in an interview with The New Yorker:

The same article, however, points out that some British dialect was retained in the books, and in some cases certain phrases were replaced with more recognizable British phrases, such as "spanking good" for "cracking."

Difficulties in translation 
The Harry Potter series presents many challenges to translators, such as rhymes, acronyms, dialects, culture, riddles, jokes, invented words, and plot points that revolve around spellings or initials. These have been dealt with by various translators with different degrees of modification to the meaning of the original text.

Translation strategies 
The books carried a number of words that are considered loaded names by linguists and translators, meaning that they carry a semantic load, and that their morphology (structure) and phonology (sound) need to be adapted when translating them to a foreign language, for example the house names (Ravenclaw = raven + claw), or Voldemort's name ("flight of death" or "theft of death" in French). These words were translated in different countries using several translation strategies, such as copying the names with no attempt to transmit the original English meaning, transliterating even if the name lost its original meaning, replacing the name with another given name from the target language, or translating the name using native words that conveyed the same meaning. For example, in the Russian first book the transliterating strategy was used for some names because the "th" sound does not exist in Russian, so "Slytherin" was transliterated as "Slizerin". The translator of the second book chose the translating strategy instead, and she renamed the houses, "Hufflepuff" becoming "Puffendui" and "Ravenclaw" becoming "Kogtevran" (from the Russian word for claw, "kogot'"). In the Italian editions, the house names were changed to animal-colour pairings: Gryffindor is "Grifondoro" ("grifon d'oro" means "golden griffin"), Slytherin is "Serpeverde" ("serpe verde" means "green snake"), Ravenclaw was, in the first edition of the first book, "Pecoranera" ("pecora nera", "black sheep"), but was then changed to "Corvonero" ("corvo nero", "black raven") and Hufflepuff is "Tassorosso" ("tasso rosso", "red badger") in the first translation and the films and "Tassofrasso" in the revisited translation. In the French translation, the name "Hogwarts" is changed to "Poudlard", which means "bacon lice", roughly maintaining the original idea of warts of a hog.

Marketers of Harry Potter-themed toys pressured translators not to change the names of people and things so that they could call the toys by the same name in different countries.

Culture and language 
Many of the nuances of British culture and language will be unfamiliar to international readers. Such things require careful and creative translating. For the Hebrew translation, some of the Christian references were changed, because Israelis have less familiarity with cultural Christianity than readers elsewhere: a scene in which Sirius Black sings a parody of "God Rest Ye Merry Gentlemen" replaced the song with a parody of "Mi Y'malel," a Chanukah song; on the other hand, in the Yiddish translation, translator Arun Viswanath retained all the Christian references, feeling that his readership would be familiar enough with them. In the French translation, explanations of certain features of British schools unfamiliar to French students were inserted in the dialogues (e.g., "Prefect" and "Head Boy"), but they were not distinguished from explanations in the original text of differences between ordinary British schools and wizarding schools. This could mislead readers into thinking that these features of the house and boarding systems didn't exist in real-world British schools.

Nonstandard English present in the book also had to be given careful consideration. The character Rubeus Hagrid's West Country dialect, for example, needed to be rendered in other languages to reflect the fact that he speaks with an accent and uses particular types of slang. In the Japanese translation, he speaks in the Tōhoku dialect, which to a Japanese reader conveys a similar provincial feel. The same was done in Ukrainian translation where Hagrid speaks a mixture of Western Ukrainian dialects. In the Yiddish translation, translator Arun Viswanath attempted to mirror Rowling's use of regional British dialects using Yiddish dialects. 
"I tried to transpose the wizarding world onto a map of the Yiddish-speaking world" — pre World War II — "without making the characters Jewish. Filch speaks in a thick Lithuanian Yiddish accent and doesn’t pronounce the 'sh' sound, so he says sabes instead of shabes, and Hagrid, who despises him and speaks a very distinct rural English, speaks in a thick, almost exaggerated Polish Yiddish. I thought this was a good approach because it helps show the tension between them. As for Snape and McGonagall, well, they’re Litvaks. They just are."

Some translations changed foods that appeared in the book into foods more common in the culture of their target audience in order to be more recognisable and relatable. The Hebrew translation of the scene where Dumbledore offers Professor McGonagall a lemon sherbet had him offer her a Krembo, a popular Israeli treat, instead. According to the Hebrew translator, "the point of the lemon sherbets is to tell us something about Dumbledore’s character in that this wise old wizard with a long white beard carries around a children’s treat in his pocket. The equivalent children’s dessert in Israel is the krembo. If I’d translated it as a lemon sucking candy, it wouldn’t have imparted the same image of Dumbledore." The Arabic translation, which was written with a predominantly Muslim audience in mind, omitted references to food and drink forbidden by Islam. All references to pork and bacon were replaced with eggs and all references to alcoholic beverages were replaced with water, except in the case of the Death Eaters, who are villains. However, the Hebrew translation left in place references to bacon despite reader complaints that such products violated the laws of Kashrut, with the translator justifying it on the basis that the characters were not Jewish. The Chinese translation keeps the word "cornflakes" and has a footnote explaining what cornflakes are.

As the Arabic translators were seeking to cater to religiously conservative readers, they also removed every reference to characters kissing, even on the cheek, and had them wave instead.

Several other terms were translated to create cultural references for the target audience. For example, the "golden snitch" from Quidditch is rendered as "goldene flaterl" (golden butterfly) in the Yiddish translation, butterflies being a common symbol in Yiddish folktales. Similarly, the Snatchers, a group of people who capture Muggle-born wizards and other enemies of the Death Eater regime and hand them over for money following Voldemort's takeover of the Ministry of Magic, were referred to as Szmalcownicy in the Polish translation, in reference to Poles who sold out Jews to the Nazis for money during the Holocaust.

The title of the seventh book, Harry Potter and the Deathly Hallows, proved particularly difficult to translate into different languages. Rowling solved the problem by providing translators with an alternate title: Harry Potter and the Relics of Death. This became the basis for most translations of the title.

Languages with different word order than English presented challenges when a character begins speaking and is interrupted before finishing. For instance, in Harry Potter and the Deathly Hallows, Ron Weasley asks his mother "Why in the name of Merlin's saggy left..." before his father cuts him off and scolds him for talking to her that way. In other languages, such as Hebrew, nouns come before modifier adjectives, but as it is never revealed what noun Ron intended to use, it proved difficult to translate without significant guesswork.

Rhymes, anagrams, and acronyms 
The series involves many songs, poems, and rhymes, some of which proved difficult to translators. One rhyme, a riddle told by a sphinx in Harry Potter and the Goblet of Fire, posed a particular problem. The riddle involves taking words from a poem and using them to form a longer word, "spider," in answer to the riddle. In the Taiwanese translation, the English words are simply put in parentheses. In other translations, the riddle is changed to provide different words that can be put together to make up the translated version of "spider".

Some acronyms also proved difficult; the abbreviations "O.W.L.s" (Ordinary Wizarding Levels) and "N.E.W.T.s" (Nastily Exhausting Wizarding Tests) needed to be translated to reflect the fact that their abbreviations spelled out the names of animals associated with the wizarding world, which did not always work in other languages. "N.E.W.T.s" was translated into Swedish as "F.U.T.T." (Fruktansvärt Utmattande Trollkarls-Test, Terribly Exhausting Wizard's Test). "Futt" means "measly" in Swedish.

Other challenging names in the series include the Mirror of Erised ("desire" backwards) and Voldemort's real name. In the latter's case, the name is an anagram based on the character's birth name, Tom Marvolo Riddle, which is rearranged to spell "I am Lord Voldemort". This has required translators to alter Riddle's name to make the anagram work. Sometimes translators manage to alter only one part of the name whereas others have replaced the entire name to preserve the anagram. Other translations, such as the Taiwanese Chinese and Japanese versions, sidestepped the issue altogether by displaying the main text of the anagram in English and added in the meaning in brackets beside it. The Vietnamese version displayed the original anagram in English and added a footnote.

Invented words, proper nouns, and names 
Rowling invented a great number of words and phrases for the books such as spells, incantations, magical words, items, and place names. Many of these words involve word play, rhyming, and historical references that are difficult to translate. A large number of spells are drawn from or inspired by Latin, and have a certain resonance with English speakers due to its relatively large proportion of Latinate-derived vocabulary. For example, priori incantatem (a spell which causes the last spells performed by a wand to be reproduced in reverse order) would be familiar to many English-speaking readers as the words prior (previous) and incantation (spell, charm). To create a similar effect in the Hindi version, the Sanskrit, typical in mantras, has been used for the spells. Some translators have created new words themselves; others have resorted to transliteration. Names that involve word play, such as Knockturn Alley and Pensieve are also difficult to translate.

In Harry Potter and the Philosopher’s Stone, when Professor McGonagall is about to introduce Harry to Oliver Wood, she asks another professor if she can "borrow Wood for a moment", momentarily confusing Harry. In order to retain this pun, the Yiddish translation renames Wood as "Oliver Holtz", "holtz" being the Yiddish for wood, unlike the Italian one, which changed the surname to "Baston", from "bastone", "stick", but returned to the original "Wood" with the second translation.

Often, names in Harry Potter have historical or linguistic significance in English, which may create problems if the translator does not recognise it. Rowling commented on this phenomenon in Conversations with J.K. Rowling, in which she complained that the Italian translation of Professor Dumbledore's last name was "Silente"; rather than recognising that "Dumbledore" was an old Devon word for "bumblebee," the translator took the word "dumb" and translated it as "silent". In contrast, the Czech translator used the Old Czech word for bumblebee – Brumbál (in modern Czech čmelák). The French translation renamed Severus Snape as 'Rogue'; in Italian he was renamed "Piton" (from the Italian "pitone", "python"). Hungarian also calls him "Piton". Instead, the same Italian translation changed the name of Professor Sybill Trelawney into "Sibilla Cooman", which resembles the Italian "Sibilla Cumana", the Cumaean Sibyl, although, like many other names, it was brought back to the original in the revised translation.

Plot points 
In some cases, English-speaking fans have sought clues to the story's mysteries by examining the way certain parts of the books have been translated in foreign editions. A case in point is the identity of a character mentioned by initials only in the book Harry Potter and the Half-Blood Prince. The English initials R.A.B. could have belonged to several minor characters from the books, but variations on the initials in other languages gave evidence to the true identity of the mystery character: in the Dutch edition of the book R.A.B. was translated into R.A.Z., 'zwart' being Dutch for 'black'; in the Norwegian edition, R.A.B. translates to 'R.A.S.', svart being Norwegian for 'black'; and in the Finnish edition the initials were R.A.M., 'musta' being Finnish for 'black'. Fans took this to mean that the character was Regulus Black, the brother of Sirius Black; when Harry Potter and the Deathly Hallows was published, this was revealed to be the case.

Similarly, the title for Harry Potter and the Order of the Phoenix did not make it obvious whether the word "Order" referred to a group of people or to a directive. The information that it was a group of people was then determined by viewing the title in other languages. The Vietnamese translation, which was originally published in instalments, originally interpreted "Order" as a directive and translated it as "Harry Potter và Mệnh lệnh Phượng hoàng"; when it became clear that "Order" referred to a group of people, the title was changed to "Harry Potter và Hội Phượng hoàng".

Rowling released an alternative title for Harry Potter and the Deathly Hallows for use by translators finding difficulty translating its meaning. The alternative title (in English) is Harry Potter and the Relics of Death. In Italy the title has been translated as Harry Potter e i doni della morte replacing "hallows" with "presents" because the word "relic" is often used in reference to the remains or personal effects of a saint. This variation was proposed and then approved by J.K. Rowling.

Character gender 
A few characters in the series are identified with a title and last name, or with a gender-neutral name. In some languages—for example, those where adjectives are gendered—it was necessary for the translator to guess the character's gender. The Hebrew translation initially made Blaise Zabini a girl, though the character was revealed to be a boy in later books. To avoid this problem, Isabel Nunes, the Portuguese translator, asked Rowling about the gender of some of the characters—Zabini, Professor Sinistra, and "R.A.B."—while working on her translations.

Notes

References

Further reading
 Archived at Ghostarchive and the Wayback Machine:

External links 

 Article from "Translorial", Part I, Part II
 The Intricacies of Onomastics in Harry Potter and its French Translation (La Clé des Langues)
 Article about American English "translation"
 Interview with the Swedish translator of the series
 Harry Potter's Polish Translation – Has Andrzej Polkowski Managed to Put it Into Polish Successfully?
 Article on the Harry Potter Wiki
 International cover gallery
 The Sphinx's Song in 13 Languages
 Collection of foreign editions of "Harry Potter" books 

 
Language comparison
Lists of fantasy books